Oireachtas Report is an Irish political television programme broadcast on RTÉ One. Presented by Edel McAllister, Ailbhe Conneely and Conor McMorrow one per edition, it transmits nightly highlights of that day's proceedings in the national parliament of Ireland, known as the Oireachtas.

External links
 Official site (contains archive footage of previous transmissions)

Irish television news shows
RTÉ News and Current Affairs
RTÉ original programming